Taekwondo, for the 2013 Bolivarian Games, took place from 25 November to 28 November 2013.

Medal table
Key:

Medal summary

Men

Women

Mixed

References

Events at the 2013 Bolivarian Games
2013 in taekwondo
2013 Bolivarian Games